Party of Rights of Bosnia and Herzegovina 1861 is political party in Bosnia and Herzegovina.
It was founded at the end of 1990-is as a pendant of Croatian Party of Rights 1861 from Croatia. President of party is Vlado Musa, and party's headquarters is in Sarajevo. 
They define themselves as a "multi-ethnic party for citizens of Bosnia and Herzegovina, no matter on ethnical origin and religion, who bealive in united Bosnia and Herzegovina". As their Croatian sister-party they are barely active in politics in 2010s.

Sources

Conservative parties in Bosnia and Herzegovina
Croat political parties in Bosnia and Herzegovina
Croatian nationalist parties
1990 establishments in Bosnia and Herzegovina
Croatian irredentism